The 5th Annual MTV Millennial Awards were held on June 2, 2018 at the Palacio de los Deportes in Mexico City, and was broadcast on June 3, 2018 through MTV Latin America. The awards celebrate the best of Latin music and the digital world of the millennial generation. The ceremony was hosted by Mon Laferte e La Divaza.

Performances
Anitta 
J Balvin  
 Becky G 
 Liam Payne 
 Mon Laferte
 Sofía Reyes 
 Jason Derulo
 De La Ghetto
Natti Natasha
 Paty Cantú 
 Jesse Baez

References

2018 television awards
2018 music awards
2018 in Latin music